Josie Osborne is a Canadian politician who was elected to the Legislative Assembly of British Columbia in the 2020 provincial election. She represents the electoral district of Mid Island-Pacific Rim as a member of the British Columbia New Democratic Party (BC NDP). She has served in the cabinet of British Columbia since 2020, currently as Minister of Energy, Mines and Low Carbon Innovation.

She previously served as mayor of Tofino, British Columbia from 2013 to 2020. When she was first elected, she was Canada's only Green Party-affiliated mayor.

Biography 
Osborne studied marine biology at the University of British Columbia, then pursued a master's degree in resource management at Simon Fraser University. She moved to Tofino for a position as fisheries biologist for the Nuu-chah-nulth Tribal Council, and later joined Raincoast Education Society, a local environmental education non-profit organization.

She ran as the mayor of Tofino unopposed as the Green Party candidate in both a 2013 by-election and the 2014 municipal election. She was re-elected in 2018 with 86.75% of the overall vote.

Osborne supported the introduction of proportional representation in the 2018 British Columbia electoral reform referendum.

In March 2019, Osborne spoke in favour of more affordable housing in Greater Vancouver.

In September 2020, Osborne announced her intention to seek the BC NDP nomination for the riding of Mid Island-Pacific Rim in the next provincial election. Osborne was successful and was elected as Member of the Legislative Assembly at the October 2020 general election. Tofino is expected to elect a new mayor after Osborne's election to the provincial legislature. A mayoral by-election was held in February 2021.

On November 26, 2020, Osborne was sworn in to the Executive Council of British Columbia as Minister of Municipal Affairs under Premier John Horgan; she was then appointed Minister of Land, Water, and Resource Stewardship and Minister Responsible for Fisheries in February 2022. She was subsequently named Minister of Energy, Mines and Low Carbon Innovation in the Eby ministry on December 7, 2022.

Electoral record

References 

Living people
Green Party of Canada politicians
Canadian women environmentalists
Women mayors of places in British Columbia
People from the Alberni-Clayoquot Regional District
Canadian marine biologists
University of British Columbia alumni
Simon Fraser University alumni
British Columbia New Democratic Party MLAs
Women MLAs in British Columbia
21st-century Canadian women politicians
Women government ministers of Canada
Members of the Executive Council of British Columbia
Year of birth missing (living people)